Rieffel is a surname. Notable people with the surname include:

 Lt. Rieffel, French commander of Casemate d'Oberroedern Sud in World War II
 Eleanor Rieffel, American mathematician
 Lisa Rieffel (born 1975), American actress, singer and musician
 Marc Rieffel, American mathematician